Wellington da Silva Serezuella or simply Wellington (born September 13, 1982 in Cambé-PR), is a Brazilian attacking midfielder. He currently plays for Paraná Clube.

Club career
Made professional debut for Atlético-PR in the Campeonato Paranaense away to Francisco Beltrão on February 2, 2003 in a 0-2 defeat.

Contract
Atlético-PR 21 February 2007 to 21 February 2010
Ferroviária (Loan) 15 February 2008 to 20 May 2008

External links
 sambafoot
 rubronegro
 CBF
 furacao
 zerozero

1982 births
Living people
Brazilian footballers
Club Athletico Paranaense players
Rio Branco Esporte Clube players
Associação Ferroviária de Esportes players
Sport Club do Recife players
Fortaleza Esporte Clube players
ABC Futebol Clube players
Paraná Clube players
Clube Atlético Bragantino players
Association football midfielders